Retropolis, released in 1996, is the second studio album by the Swedish progressive rock band The Flower Kings (not counting Roine Stolt's 1994 solo album). The album's art is inspired by the film Metropolis.

Track listing

Credits
Roine Stolt - lead vocals, guitars, additional keyboards
Tomas Bodin - Hammond C3 organ, piano, Mellotron, synthesizers, effects
Hasse Bruniusson - percussion, drumkit (10)
Jaime Salazar - drumkit, percussion
Michael Stolt - bass guitar

Guests
Hasse Fröberg - vocals (4, 7)
Ulf Wallander - soprano saxophone (6, 11)

Production
 Per Aleskog – cover art 
 Hippiefied Art (i.e. Roine Stolt) – sleeve design assistant
 DCM – sleeve design assistant 
 Lilian Forsberg – photography
 Dexter Frank Jr. (i.e. Roine Stolt) – engineer, mixing
 Tegelmann  – photography

References

1996 albums
The Flower Kings albums